The Lordship and Barony of Rannoch is a Scottish feudal barony. King James IV, granted the lands of Rannoch, which lies in highland Perthshire, and its neighbouring forest, loch and islands, to Sir Robert Menzies of that Ilk (1475-1557) as the free barony of Rannoch on 1 Sep 1502 (Sir Robert also held the baronies of Menzies and Camsorny). On 1 May 1533, King James V granted Alexander Menzies, (1504-1563), son and heir apparent of Sir Robert, the lands and barony of Rannoch (including Downane, Kinclauchir, Cammyserachtis, Ardlaroch, Kilquhonane, Lairan, Ardlair, Largan, the island of Loch Rannoch and Irochty and all the lochs and islands).

Barons of Rannoch

a: The Campbells of Glenorchy had some claim to the lands of Rannoch in the 17th century: on 25 July 1661, John Campbell the younger of Glen Orchy sold to John Campbell of Ferdew the lands and barony of Rannoch. Nevertheless, on 1 Mar 1679 James Menzies of Culdares, had a sasine of the lands and barony of Rannoch

b: having no surviving sons, the Nova Scotia baronetcy of Menzies expired

External links
 Burkes Peerage Website
 National Archives of Scotland

Feudalism in Scotland
Rannoch